The 1996–97 Japan Ice Hockey League season was the 31st season of the Japan Ice Hockey League. Six teams participated in the league, and the Seibu Tetsudo won the championship.

Regular season

Playoffs

External links
 Japan Ice Hockey Federation

Japan
Ice Hock
Japan Ice Hockey League seasons
Japan